Nono Maldonado (born in Mayagüez) is a Puerto Rican fashion designer and entrepreneur who has also done interior design. He was a fashion editor at Esquire magazine in the 1970s before returning to Puerto Rico, where he continued to work in the fashion industry.

Personal life and career

Fashion editor

Maldonado, born in Mayagüez, Puerto Rico, learned about good taste as a child at the hand of his parents, Raúl, an agricultural engineer, and Esperanza, a homemaker.  In 1967 and started his career in the fashion world as a buyer at Bloomingdale’s in New York. He left Bloomingdale’s to become the Assistant Fashion Director of the Men’s Fashion Association, the promotion agency for men’s wear designers and manufacturers. He was also buyer, designer and public relations consultant for several boutiques in New York. He was named Fashion Editor for Esquire magazine from 1972 to 1975. During these years he was twice elected to the International List of the World’s Best Dressed Men directed then by the well-known publicist Eleanor Lambert, now published yearly by Vanity Fair Magazine. Maldonado has also been on the editorial team of Caras, a high-fashion magazine.

Fashion designer

He returned to Puerto Rico in 1976 and in June 1977 opened his own boutique and started designing for men under his own label. In 1980 he presented his first women’s wear collection.

In September 2014, Maldonado was a judge for the San Juan Moda fashion show. San Juan fashion week takes place twice a year.

Interior design
In early 2017, along with Hirsch Bedner Associates of San Francisco, Maldonado was tasked with redesigning the ballroom of the luxurious St. Regis Bahía Beach Resort in Río Grande, Puerto Rico.

References

External links
 In Puerto Rico Magazine - Nono Maldonado 2019 scholarship announcement

1945 births
Living people
Puerto Rican fashion designers